This is a list of Spanish television related events in 1982.

Events 
 7 February: On air episode ‘’Algo se muere en el alma’’ in the series Verano Azul, a significant moment in Spanish television, with the death of the character of Chanquete.
 16 April: 180 News Department workers in TVE (among them Clara Isabel Francia, Luis Mariñas, Rosa María Mateo o Baltasar Magro) condemn political pressures on their work.
 7 June: Official inauguracion of Torrespaña.
 13 June: Televisión Española airs live and worldwide the 1982 FIFA World Cup, taking place in Madrid.
 23 July: Eugenio Nasarre is appointed Director General of RTVE.
 17 August: TVE airs last episode of the third season of Dallas; the character of J. R. Ewing (Larry Hagman) is shot.
 20 August: Mayra Gómez Kemp debuts as hostess of Quiz show Un, dos, tres... responda otra vez.
 6 December: José María Calviño is appointed Director General of RTVE.

Debuts

Television programs

La 1

Ending this year

La 1

Foreign series debuts in Spain

Births 
 22 January - Lorena García Díez, journalist & hostess
 7 February - Esther Vaquero, journalist.
 14 February - Isabel Jiménez, journalist.
 25 March - David Bustamante, singer.
 6 April - Miguel Ángel Silvestre, actor.
 4 May - Isabel Aboy, actress.
 9 June - Norma Ruiz, actress.
 20 June - Antonio Castelo, comedian.
 28 June - Anna Allen, actress.
 20 July - Laila Jiménez, journalist.
 9 August - Anna Simon, hostess.
 29 September - Virginia Maestro, singer.
 19 October - Ana Arias, actress.
 29 October - Mariona Tena, actress.
 11 December - Natalia, hostess & singer
 23 December - Beatriz Luengo, actress & singer.
 25 December - Dani Martínez - host.

Deaths 
 16 February - Nélida Quiroga, actress.
 15 July - Manuel Lozano Sevilla, crítico taurino.
 14 October - Víctor Ruiz Iriarte, guionista.

See also
 1982 in Spain
 List of Spanish films of 1982

References 

1982 in Spanish television